Kamay is a rural locality (a selo) in Shebalinsky District, the Altai Republic, Russia. The population was 79 as of 2016. There is 1 street.

Geography 
Kamay is located 45 km north of Shebalino (the district's administrative centre) by road. Aktel is the nearest rural locality.

References 

Rural localities in Shebalinsky District